Comesperma drummondii, commonly known as Drummond's milkwort,   is a slender herb in the family Polygalaceae. It is a perennial herb growing to between 20 cm and 1.2 m high, on sandy and gravelly soils  Its  pink-blue-purple flowers may be seen from August to November.

The species was first formally described by the botanist Joachim Steetz in Plantae Preissianae in 1848.

The species occurs in Western Australia, in Beard's Eremaean  and South-West provinces.

References

drummondii
Flora of Western Australia
Plants described in 1848
Taxa named by Joachim Steetz